Gateway to Peace (German: Das Tor zum Frieden) is a 1951 Austrian  drama film directed by Wolfgang Liebeneiner and starring Paul Hartmann, Vilma Degischer and Hilde Krahl.

The film's sets were designed by the art director Fritz Jüptner-Jonstorff.

Cast
 Paul Hartmann as Paul Dressler, ungarischer Gutsbesitzer
 Vilma Degischer as Elisabeth Dressler
 Michael Tellering as Martin - beider Sohn
 Ida Krottendorf as Luise - beider Tochter 
 Hilde Krahl as Maria Gebhart, Konzertsängerin
 Walter Ladengast as Thomas
 Günter Krula as Der kleine Niki - beider Sohn
 Klaus Dorneich as Der große Niki - beider Sohn
 Kurt Bülau as Toni Neubauer, Baumeister
 Gisa Wurm as Mutter Thomas
 Hans Franz Pokorny as Moosbauer
 Maria von Höslin as Die Moosbäuerin 
 Jutta Bornemann as Magd Klara
 Alfred Schnayder as Organist
 Pater Beda as Pater

References

Bibliography 
 Fritsche, Maria. Homemade Men In Postwar Austrian Cinema: Nationhood, Genre and Masculinity . Berghahn Books, 2013.

External links 
 

1951 films
Austrian historical drama films
1951 drama films
1950s historical drama films
1950s German-language films
Films directed by Wolfgang Liebeneiner
Films set in the 1910s
Films set in the 1940s